The FINA Diving World Cup is an international biennial diving competition that was first contested in The Woodlands, Texas in 1979. The 2012 edition served as Diving's test event for the 2012 Olympics, as well as the final qualifying event for Diving at those Games. Tom Daley (UK, b. 21 May 1994) is the youngest medallist at a FINA Diving World Cup. He was aged 13 years 277 days when he won bronze in the 10 m synchro competition in Beijing, China, on 22 February 2008.

Editions

Medals (1979–2022)

See also 
 FINA Diving Grand Prix (https://fr.wikipedia.org/wiki/Grand_Prix_FINA_de_plongeon)
 FINA Diving World Series
 World Diving Championships
 FINA World Junior Diving Championships

References

External links 
 FINA Diving World Cup By Season at TheSports.org

 
International diving competitions
Diving
Biennial sporting events